The 51st International 500 Mile Sweepstakes was held at the Indianapolis Motor Speedway in Speedway, Indiana, over two days, Tuesday May 30 and Wednesday May 31, 1967. The race was dominated by Parnelli Jones in the radically new, four-wheel drive STP-Paxton Turbocar gas turbine entered by prolific car owner Andy Granatelli. With three laps to go, however, Jones coasted to a stop when a $6 transmission bearing failed. A. J. Foyt assumed the lead, and weaved his way through a pileup on the final lap, to win his third Indy 500 victory.

Foyt's victory was the first Indy 500 win for Goodyear tires since 1919. After leaving the sport in 1922, Goodyear returned to the sport 1964, and in 1967, snapped Firestone's record of 43 consecutive Indy 500 wins.

The race was scheduled for Tuesday May 30. The race started on time at 11:00 a.m. EST, but after only 18 laps, rain began to fall. The race was red-flagged, and the resumption was held at 10:00 a.m. the following day. Though temperatures on Wednesday were cool, skies were sunny, and the race was run to completion.

Race schedule
The annual 500 Victory Banquet was scheduled for Wednesday May 31. After the race was postponed for rain, the banquet was still held as scheduled, which was just hours after the checkered flag fell.

Time trials

Pole day – Saturday May 13
Going into time trials, Mario Andretti was the favorite for the pole position. On the final day of practice, he turned the fastest practice lap in Indy history at over 168 mph. Among the others that were expected to challenge for the front row were Roger McCluskey, A. J. Foyt, and Gordon Johncock. Parnelli Jones, driving the new Granatelli STP-Paxton Turbocar gas turbine was in the top ten of practice speeds, but never on top, and some in the garage area were accusing the team of sandbagging.

The first car out to qualify was Ronnie Duman. At about 2:30 p.m., Joe Leonard took over the provisional pole position with a run of 166.098 mph, a new track record. About an hour and a half later, Dan Gurney took over the pole with another record run of 167.224 mph. Gurney's time on top was short-lived, however, as Mario Andretti was the next car to make an attempt. Andretti set new 1-lap and 4-lap track records to win the pole position for the second year in a row. His third lap (169.779 mph) stood as the single lap record, and his four-lap average wound up at 168.982 mph.

At the end of the day, the field was filled to 25 cars. Later in the day, Gordon Johncock (166.559 mph) squeezed himself on to the front row, qualifying third. A. J. Foyt suffered mechanical trouble on his first attempt, and pulled off the course. Later on, he returned to the track to qualify in fourth starting position. Parnelli Jones in the Granatelli Turbine qualified 6th. As was noted by many other teams at the time, Jones qualified with a race day set-up, while the piston-powered entries practiced and qualified with "qualifying setups," including light fuel loads, lightened transmission components, higher-revving gear ratios, a percentage of "pop," or nitromethane in the fuel, and so on. The STP crew had Jones qualify with a straight race-day setup, including the use of standard fuel (aircraft-grade kerosene, in this case).

Second day – Sunday May 14
The second day of time trials was rained out.

Third day – Saturday May 20
The field filled to 33 cars after 23 attempts were made. Six cars were bumped including Jackie Stewart. Roger McCluskey, who was not able to qualify on pole day, was the fastest car of the afternoon (165.563 mph).

Bump day – Sunday May 21
Graham Hill and Jackie Stewart successfully bumped their way into the field. Jim Hurtubise tried to qualify using a front-engined car, but he was too slow.

Race summary

Start (Tuesday)
The race started on Tuesday May 30 under threatening skies. At the start, polesitter Mario Andretti briefly took the lead into turn one. However, Jones swept to the outside from 6th starting position, and passed four cars in turn one. Exiting turn two, he dove below Andretti and took the lead down the backstretch. Jones ran the first lap at a record 154 mph, and started pulling out to a sizable lead.

On lap 3, LeeRoy Yarbrough spun in turn four, briefly bringing out the yellow. His car was not damaged, and he continued. After only a few laps, Mario Andretti pulled into the pits with mechanical troubles. The crew went to work on the car. On lap 18, rain began to fall, and the yellow light came on with Jones leading. On the 19th lap, the red flag came out and the race was halted at approximately 11:16 am. The rain continued most of the afternoon, and at about 4:15 p.m., officials postponed the conclusion until the next day. Scoring reverted to the completion of the 18th lap, and all cars were eligible for the resumption except Lloyd Ruby, who had already wheeled his car back to the garage with broken valves.

Restart (Wednesday)
Wednesday May 31 dawned cool but sunny and the race was resumed at 10:00 a.m. local time. George Snider fell ill overnight with a cold, and Lloyd Ruby, who had dropped out the day earlier, took over his car in relief for Wednesday. Two unscored warm-up laps were run behind the pace car, and the field of now 32 cars took the green flag to restart single-file. Jones continued where he left off and led on what was now the 19th lap.

First half
On lap 52, LeeRoy Yarbrough suffered his second spin in turn four in two days. This time he tangled with the leader Parnelli Jones. Jones went low to lap Yarbrough, but was pinched down on the apron and the two cars touched wheels. Both cars went spinning into the grass, but they were not damaged and both drivers drove away unscathed. Dan Gurney briefly took the lead after the incident, but gave it up after only two laps when he pitted.

The first half shaped up with Jones dominating in the Turbine, chased by Dan Gurney, A. J. Foyt, and Al Unser, Sr., among others. On the leader's 65th lap, Mario Andretti lost a wheel in the exit of turn one. He came a stop in turn two and was out of the race with only 59 laps completed.

On his first pit stop on lap 80, Parnelli Jones escaped possible disaster as he began to pull away before the fuel hose was disengaged. The hose jerked and caused a spill, but Jones pulled away without damage and without a fire breaking out. A. J. Foyt slipped by to take the lead. Four laps later Foyt handed the lead back to Jones when he himself pitted.

Several cars were involved in a quick succession of crashes around the midway point. Art Pollard spun in turn three, but continued. Moments later, Carl Williams spun in front of Bob Veith as they diced through traffic in turn three. Veith's car suffered major damage to the nose, but both drivers were able to continue. Under the same yellow light, Wally Dallenbach wrecked into the inside wall of the mainstretch. Moments later, Cale Yarborough spun out in the north chute. Approaching the scene, Lloyd Ruby (in George Snider's car) spun out with LeeRoy Yarbrough, and both cars went sliding to the infield grass in turn four. Ruby's car hit the inside fence and was out. LeeRoy Yarbrough, after his third spin of the race, was also out. Cale Yarborough, however, got back in his car and continued. About three laps later, Johnny Rutherford wrecked on his own in turn two.

Second half
Parnelli Jones continued to dominate the race, but gave up the lead to A. J. Foyt for laps 131–149. Dan Gurney, a contender in the first half, dropped out on lap 160.

Arnie Knepper (engine), Jackie Stewart (engine), Cale Yarborough and Mel Kenyon (crash), all dropped out of the race. Jochen Rindt, who experienced a difficult month and a difficult race, dropped out with a broken valve. Rindt, apparently not impressed with the Speedway, said he was not interested in coming back, but he did return one additional time in 1968.

With about 7 laps left for the leaders, Gordon Johncock spun out, briefly bringing out the yellow. At this point, Parnelli Jones seemingly had the race wrapped up, holding nearly a full lap lead over second place A. J. Foyt. Third place Al Unser was more than two laps down. Shockingly, with only four laps to go, a $6 transmission bearing failed, and the Turbine quietly coasted to a stop near the entrance to pit lane. The STP Granatelli team was in disbelief as they ran to the car's aid.

A. J. Foyt drove by into first place with only four laps to go, but the drama was not yet over. On the final lap, Foyt was driving through turn four when a four-car crash broke out at the north end of the main straightaway. Foyt had a premonition of trouble (he later suggested that he had subconsciously noticed the crowd looking down the straightaway instead of at him) and backed off, and with savvy driving, weaved his way through the wreckage. He avoided the spinning cars and debris and took the checkered flag for his third win at Indianapolis. The red and checkered flags immediately halted the race. Al Unser finished in second place for the first of three times in his career.

Box score

Alternates
First alternate: Lucien Bianchi  (#27)

Failed to qualify

Chris Amon  (#28)
Chuck Arnold (#44)
Lorenzo Bandini  (#32) – Withdrawn
Bob Bondurant  (#33, #88)
Johnny Boyd (#66)
Norm Brown  (#47)
Ronnie Bucknum  (#23, #75)
Bill Cheesbourg (#32)
Bob Christie (#65, #82)
Gary Congdon (#18, #19, #67, #76, #84, #90)
Richie Ginther  (#42)
Masten Gregory (#11, #20)
Norm Hall (#50)
Bob Harkey (#20, #57)
Bob Hurt  (#29, #98)
Jim Hurtubise (#11, #56, #83)
Bruce Jacobi  (#33, #75, #77)
Bobby Johns (#71, #76)
Ralph Ligouri  (#35)
Sam McQuagg  – Did not appear
Don Meacham  (#62)
Mike Mosley  (#91)
Lothar Motschenbacher  (#57) – Entry declined, not in good standing with USAC
Rick Muther  (#76) – Failed rookie orientation
Peter Revson  (#33) – Entry declined, not in good standing with USAC
Pedro Rodriguez  (#90)
Vern Root  (#90)
Ebb Rose (#83, #89)
Les Scott  (#50)
Sammy Sessions  (#11, #68, #75)
Mickey Shaw  (#60)
Al Smith  (#11, #75)
Gig Stephens  (#36)
Chuck Stevenson (#54)
Don Thomas  (#73)
Greg Weld  (#96)
Bob Wente (#84)
Dempsey Wilson (#11, #51)

Race statistics

Broadcasting

Radio
The race was carried live on the IMS Radio Network. Sid Collins served as chief announcer for the 16th year. It was Collins' 20th year overall with the crew. Len Sutton served as "driver expert" for the second year. At the conclusion of the race, Lou Palmer reported from victory lane.

The entire on-air crew remained consistent from 1966. The broadcast reached over 900 affiliates including Armed Forces Network, the CBC, and shortwave to Vietnam. The broadcast had an estimated 100 million listeners worldwide. The original broadcast on Tuesday May 30 came on air at 10:30 a.m. local time and was scheduled for four and a half hours, including a 30-minute pre-race segment. When the race was red flagged for rain, the network signed off at 11:45 a.m., and returned for brief weather updates at 12:15 p.m., 12:45 p.m., 1:15 p.m., 2:15 p.m., 3:15 p.m., 3:45 p.m., and 4:15 p.m., at which time the race was officially postponed. During the rain delay on Tuesday, guests to the booth included J. C. Agajanian, Rory Calhoun, as well as Lorne Greene and Michael Landon, both from the TV series Bonanza. Greene and Landon had been grand marshals for the 500 Festival Parade.

On Wednesday May 31, the broadcast came on air at 9:45 a.m. local time, leading up to the 10:00 a.m. resumption. All of the announcers and reporters from Tuesday returned to their assignments for Wednesday. Booth guests on Wednesday included Pete DePaolo, Jim Murray, Tom Harmon, and 500 Festival queen Janice Cruze Bretz. During the post-race, Sid Collins was presented with a Resolution passed by the California State Legislature from State Senator George Deukmejian and Lt. Governor Bob Finch honoring Collins' twentieth year serving on the network.

For 1967, the flagship station changed from WIBC to WTHI in Terre Haute.

Television
The race was carried in the United States on ABC's Wide World of Sports. The broadcast aired on Saturday June 10. Jim McKay anchored the telecast for the first time, with analysts Rodger Ward and pit work from Chris Economaki. The opening featured a brief recap of time trials, followed by edited race coverage.

The broadcast has re-aired on ESPN Classic starting in May 2011.

The race was shown live on MCA closed-circuit television in approximately 150-175 theaters and venues across the United States. Charlie Brockman served as anchor. The feed was transmitted internationally to Europe utilizing the "Early Bird" satellite, and to Japan using the "Lani Bird" satellite. Due to the rain delay, coverage was not available to international viewers on Wednesday. Viewers at U.S. venues were able to watch the second day of coverage with rain checks.

Topics
 This race featured six former or eventual Formula One World Champions: Graham Hill, Jim Clark, Dennis Hulme, Jochen Rindt, Jackie Stewart, Mario Andretti
The NASCAR World 600 was held on Sunday May 28, and the Indy 500 was scheduled for Tuesday May 30. NASCAR driver LeeRoy Yarbrough skips Charlotte and races at Indy. He finishes 27th. Cale Yarborough becomes the first driver to compete in both races in the same year. He finished 41st at Charlotte and 17th at Indy.

Gallery 

NOTE: The revolutionary #40 STP Turbine in the photo taken in the Speedway Museum is actually a replica built from the blueprints (as is the replica of Parnelli Jones' 1963 #98 Indy 500-winning car): The actual #40 is in the Smithsonian's National Museum of American History.

Notes

References

Works cited
Indianapolis 500 History: Race & All-Time Stats - Official Site
1967 Indianapolis 500 Radio Broadcast, Indianapolis Motor Speedway Radio Network

Indianapolis 500 races
Indianapolis 500
Indianapolis 500
1967 in American motorsport
May 1967 sports events in the United States